Karen Arthur (born August 24, 1941) is an American film director, producer, and actress.

Arthur has directed three feature films, including Lady Beware (1987) and The Mafu Cage (1978), but the majority of her work has been in television, where she has had a long and prolific career directing television movies and series. In 1985, she won a Primetime Emmy Award for Outstanding Directing in a Drama Series (for an episode of Cagney & Lacey).

She is currently a resident of the town of Springfield, Vermont.

Partial filmography

References

External links
Karen Arthur at Academy of Television Arts & Sciences

1941 births
American women film directors
American television actresses
American television directors
Emmy Award winners
American women television directors
Living people
Actresses from Omaha, Nebraska
Film directors from Nebraska
21st-century American women